Perci may refer to:

 Perci (Buzet), Croatia, a village in the town of Buzet
 Perci (Tar-Vabriga), Croatia, a village in Tar-Vabriga municipality
 Perci Garner (born 1988), American baseball pitcher
 House of Percy (spelled Perci in old French), an English noble family
 Perci militia, one side in the Batwa–Luba clashes in the Democratic Republic of the Congo

See also
 Percy (disambiguation)
 Persi (disambiguation)
 Robin van Persie (born 1983), Dutch former footballer